Sam Dalton Reich (born July 22, 1984) is an American CEO, businessman, and game show host. He is best known for his work with CollegeHumor (which as of 2020, he majority owns), the TV show Adam Ruins Everything, as well as hosting the web series "Game Changer."

Life and career 
Sam Reich is the son of Robert Reich, the former Secretary of Labor under Bill Clinton, and Clare Dalton, a retired law professor at Northeastern University. His brother, Adam Reich, is a sociology professor at Columbia University. He is of Jewish descent.

In 2000, Reich dropped out of Buckingham Browne & Nichols High School as a result of clinical depression and in order to pursue acting. Shortly thereafter, he moved to New York and founded the comedy group Dutch West, which focused on making comedy videos for the Internet. After being discovered by CollegeHumor in 2006, he was hired as Director of Original Content. He was then promoted to President of Original Content along with the premiere of The CollegeHumor Show on MTV in 2009.

In 2014, Reich founded Big Breakfast, CollegeHumor's offshoot production company, and moved CollegeHumor's video team to Los Angeles. The company has since produced Adam Ruins Everything on TruTV; Middle of the Night Show on MTV; Time Traveling Bong on Comedy Central; The Britishes on DirecTV; I Want My Phone Back on Comcast's Watchable; and Bad Internet and Rhett and Link's Buddy System on YouTube Red.

Reich is married to actress and writer Elaine Carroll, whom he met during summer camp in 2000. Together, they have collaborated on the web series Very Mary-Kate and "Precious Plum".

With CollegeHumor, he has collaborated on music videos with "Weird Al" Yankovic and former United States First Lady Michelle Obama.

On January 8, 2020, it was announced that Reich was acquiring CollegeHumor from IAC.

Filmography

Awards 
 Named to Forbes 30 Under 30 in Media Category.
 Named a multi-channel network 40 Under 40.

Awards

References

External links 
 
 
 Webby Awards Winners
 Telly Awards Winners

1984 births
21st-century American Jews
American male television actors
American male television writers
American television directors
American television writers
Buckingham Browne & Nichols School alumni
Businesspeople from Cambridge, Massachusetts
CollegeHumor
CollegeHumor people
Jewish American writers
Living people
People from Boston
Screenwriters from Massachusetts
Television producers from Massachusetts